The Schubert Theatre is a theater located in Gooding, Idaho, United States.  Built in 1920, it was listed on the National Register of Historic Places in 2004.

The building is a fairly simple two-story two-part commercial block, three bays wide.

Sound equipment installed in 1930 allowed for "talkies" to be shown.

Many articles in the Gooding County Leader chronicle the history of this theater. Opened in 1921.  It was owned by Charmianne and Lonnie Leavell, a local couple who planned to restore the theater and turn it into a cultural center for the community of Gooding;  the couple later donated the theatre to a 501 (c)(3) nonprofit, GREAT, Inc. (Gooding Restoration for Entertainment, Arts & Theater).

The theatre contains murals.

In 2017 its status is "closed" according to Cinema Treasures.

References

Cinemas and movie theaters in Idaho
Buildings and structures in Gooding County, Idaho
Theatres on the National Register of Historic Places in Idaho
National Register of Historic Places in Gooding County, Idaho